The 1965 Liège–Bastogne–Liège was the 51st edition of the Liège–Bastogne–Liège cycle race and was held on 2 May 1965. The race started and finished in Liège. The race was won by Carmine Preziosi of the Pelforth team.

General classification

References

1965
1965 in Belgian sport
1965 Super Prestige Pernod